Colobothea sexualis is a species of beetle in the family Cerambycidae. It was described by Casey in 1913. It is known from Mexico and Honduras.

References

sexualis
Beetles described in 1913